To Be Fat like Me is a 2007 American drama television film directed by Douglas Barr and starring Kaley Cuoco. It premiered on Lifetime on January 8, 2007.

Plot
Pretty, popular and athletic Aly has been banking on a softball scholarship as her ticket to college. She has an active life and never seems to sit still. When she injures her knee, she realizes that she will have to fund her education in other ways. She resents her mother because a few years ago, her mother became ill as a consequence of binge eating and used the money from her daughter's college fund in order to pay her hospital bill. Aly is overly critical of her family's high-fat diet. She even refuses to eat a cake that her mother purchased for her.

Aly enters a documentary film contest in hopes of using the prize money in order to fund her further education. Convinced that her overweight younger brother and mother use their struggles with weight as an excuse for everything wrong in their lives, Aly decides to take a summer course wearing a fat suit and hidden camera to prove personality can outshine physical appearance. Aly soon realizes how difficult the life can be for the overweight, as she is shunned by other students, despite her resolve to be kind and maintain the same personality she always had. She meets Ramona, an overweight girl in the same class who shares aspects of her personal life with Aly but feels betrayed when Aly uses this material in her documentary. Aly titles her documentary Fat Like Me, a reference to John Howard Griffin's 1961 book Black Like Me, which recounts Griffin's experience living as an African-American in the segregated Southern United States for several weeks after receiving skin-darkening injections.

Cast
 Kaley Cuoco as Alyson
 Caroline Rhea as Madelyn
 Ben Cotton as Warren
 David Lewis as Mr. Johnson
 Rachel Cairns as Jamie
 Michael Phenicie as Jim
 Brandon Olds as Adam
 Timothy Paul Perez as Coach Martin
 Carlo Marks as Michael
 Melissa Halstrom as Ramona
 Scott Little as George
 Matt Bellefleur as Eddie
 Richard Harmon as Kyle 
 Adrienne Carter as Kendall

External links
 

2007 television films
2007 films
2007 drama films
2000s American films
2000s high school films
2000s teen drama films
American drama television films
American high school films
American teen drama films
Body image in popular culture
Drama films based on actual events
Films about school bullying
Films directed by Douglas Barr
Films shot in British Columbia
Lifetime (TV network) films